CNVi or CNVio ("Connectivity Integration", Intel Integrated Connectivity I/O interface) is a proprietary connectivity interface by Intel for Wi-Fi and Bluetooth radios to lower costs and simplify their wireless modules.  In CNVi, the network adapter's large and usually expensive functional blocks (MAC components, memory, processor and associated logic/firmware) are moved inside the CPU and chipset (Platform Controller Hub).  Only the signal processor, analog and Radio frequency (RF) functions are left on an external upgradeable CRF (Companion RF) module which, as of 2019 comes in M.2 form factor (M.2 2230 and 1216 Soldered Down). Therefore, CNVi requires chipset and Intel CPU support. Otherwise the Wi-Fi + Bluetooth module has to be the traditional M.2 PCIe form factor. 

CNVio was introduced on desktop platforms in 2017 with the launch of Gemini Lake, and on mobile Intel platforms in 2018 with Coffee Lake. 
CNVio2 was introduced on desktop platform with Comet Lake and on mobile platform with Ice Lake.
CNVio2 is not backward compatible with CNVio. A computer with a CNVio slot cannot accept a CNVio2 card and a CNVio2 slot will not support a CNVio card.

The AC 9560 and 9460 family of wireless (Wi-Fi + Bluetooth) modules are the first generation of CNVi modules. They are only compatible with systems running Intel Gen. 8 or 9 processor on adapted motherboards. The non-CNVio version of the card, packaged in a traditional M.2 form factor is the Intel Wireless-AC 9260 card.
Likewise, the Wi-Fi 6E AX2xx family of cards, supporting the Wi-Fi 6 at 6 GHz, is proposed in CNVio2 or M.2 form factor: a 0 at the end of the name designates a PCI-E NGFF card (AX200, AX210 ) whereas a 1 designates a CNVio2 card (AX201, AX211, AX411).

References

Intel products
Intel chipsets